The European Case Law Identifier (ECLI) is an identifier for court decisions in Europe. The identifier consists of five elements separated by colons: ECLI:[country code]:[court identifier]:[year of decision]:[specific identifier]. The standard is laid down in the Council Conclusions inviting the introduction of the European Case Law Identifier (ECLI) and a minimum set of uniform metadata for case law of the European Union. The ECLI framework also contains a set of uniform metadata to improve search facilities for case law. Court decisions that have an ECLI assigned can be indexed by the ECLI Search Engine of the European e-Justice portal.

History
The concept of ECLI was first launched at the Legal Access Conference (Paris, December 2008) and at Jurix Conference on Artificial Intelligence and Law in Florence (December 2008). 
Around the same time, the study by a task group of the EU Council Working Group on e-Law showed that accessibility of judicial decisions, both at the national and European level, was seriously hampered by the lack of standardised identifiers and metadata:
The task group suggested to establish a voluntary common identification system based on the European Case-Law Identifier (ECLI). ECLI as an identifier would be linked to an index with references. This would enable any citizen or legal practitioner to find any decision to which ECLI has been attributed from any public or private register or database in the EU. In addition a Dublin-core implementation for case-law should be established to facilitate searching case-law in different search engines.
Based on the report of this task group, the Council of Ministers agreed on the principles of ECLI and common metadata, and asked the EU Council Working Party on Legal Data Processing (e-Law) to elaborate the initial work. This continued work resulted in the Council Conclusion inviting the introduction of the European Case Law Identifier (ECLI) and a minimum set of uniform metadata for case law of the European Union, decided upon by the Council of Ministers on 22 December 2010. It was published in the Official Journal of 29 April 2011 (2011/C 127/01).

Identifier construction
ECLI does not primarily identify a paper or electronic document containing a judgment, but instead identifies the court decision at a more abstract level. In the terminology of the Functional Requirements for Bibliographic Records on which it is based, ECLI is a work-level identifier. It is constructed with the intention to be meaningful, open, technological neutral, recognisable for both humans and computers, error-proof and interoperable with other identifiers. The formatting rules for ECLI are prescribed in detail in the Annex to the Council Conclusions. Summarized, an ECLI always consists of five parts, separated by a colon: 
 'ECLI' as a self-identifier;
 The country code, prescribed by the interinstitutional style guide of the EU. The standard uses mostly ISO 3166-1 alpha-2 codes with the exception of the United Kingdom (UK) and Greece (EL). A special code for non-states can be assigned by the European Commission;
 The court code, to be assigned by the national ECLI co-ordinator; it has a maximum length of seven positions;
 The year the judgment is rendered, written in four digits;
 A unique code to make an ECLI unique. The maximum length of this code is 25 characters. Only letters, digits and dots are to be used, other punctuation marks or whitespace are not allowed. Pre-existing national identifiers can be used for this fifth part, of which the date of judgment can be a part too. Also a serial number which is generated especially for ECLI is possible. It is up to the national ECLI co-ordinator to decide on the construction of this last part.
Only the Latin alphabet is to be used, and that ECLI is case-insensitive, although it is written preferably in capitals. 
An example of a case law identifier of the Rotterdam court is ECLI:NL:RBROT:2013:5042, which indicates a Dutch decision (NL) of 2013 of the Rotterdam court (RBROT) with serial number 5042.

ECLI website
According to paragraph 4 of the Annex to the Council Conclusions an ECLI website has to be set up, containing
 general information on ECLI;
 a list of participating countries, with, for each country: 
 the court codes used;
 information on the formatting of the fifth part of the ECLI code;
 information on the national ECLI co-ordinator.

The ECLI website was set up within the frame work of the e-justice portal of the European Union.

ECLI search engine
According to paragraph 5 of the Annex to the Council Conclusions an ECLI Search Engine has to be set up, enabling search by ECLI and metadata. This ECLI search engine launched on 4 May 2016. It provides access to national and European case law, stored in whatever database. Searches are possible on the basis of the ECLI, its metadata as well as full-text.

As prescribed by the Council Conclusions a resolver is available at https://e-justice.europa.eu/ecli/; with an ECLI typed after it, this link with show all available information on this ECLI, from whatever indexed website. The latter document also has English and French metadata.

Documents are indexed by the ECLI search engine in cooperation between the European Commission and data providers, using the sitemaps protocol and robots.txt.

Organisation
The Council of Ministers is responsible for any future changes in the standard, while the European Commission is responsible for the ECLI-website and the maintenance of the ECLI Search Engine.

National level
Every Member State (or other entity that wishes to participate in the ECLI system, including the EU itself) must have a national ECLI co-ordinator. The main responsibilities of this national ECLI co-ordinator are: 
 to decide on the court codes to be used (the third part of the ECLI);
 to decide on the construction of the fifth part of ECLI;
 to update the national information pages on the implementation of ECLI on the European e-justice portal;
 to decide on specific language varieties of certain metadata.

Implementation in individual jurisdictions 
According to the Council Conclusions, Member States are free to decide on their own implementation route. A big-bang scenario is possible, but also a step-by-step approach is allowed. International organizations may also participate and can request a "country code" from the European Commission.

The table below lists all EU Member States and their current state of ECLI implementation. Also relevant European organisations that have implemented ECLI are included.

Metadata
Metadata are to be attached to documents containing a judicial decision. They can relate to the ECLI itself (on the bibliographic work level, e.g.: date of the decision), but also to a specific editorial version (the 'expression level', e.g. a summary). In the Council Conclusions nine mandatory and eight optional metadata are listed. All these are based on the Dublin Core metadata standard. The mandatory means that without these metadata, a document can not be indexed by the ECLI Search Engine.

Mandatory metadata
The mandatory metadata, as listed in the Annex to the Council Conclusions, are: 
 dcterms:identifier: a URL where the document is located;
 dcterms:isVersionOf: the ECLI; 
 dcterms:creator: the name of the court;
 dcterms:coverage: country or part thereof;
 dcterms:date: the date of the decision;
 dcterms:language: the language of the document;
 dcterms:publisher: the organisation responsible for the publication of the current document;
 dcterms:accessRights: either public or private;
 dcterms:type: the type of decision. If none is specified it defaults to 'judicial decision'.

Optional metadata
The optional metadata, as listed in the Annex to the Council Conclusions, are: 
 dcterms:title; a Title field
 dcterms:subject: the field of law; at least one value should be picked out of a controlled vocabulary;
 dcterms:abstract: a summary or description;
 dcterms:description: keywords or headnotes;
 dcterms:contributor: judges, advocate-general or other staff;
 dcterms:issued: the date of the current document (not necessarily the date of the decision);
 dcterms:references: References to other case law (the use of CELEX-numbers or ECLI's is advised, but also other formats are allowed);
 dcterms:isReplacedBy: ECLI by which the ECLI has been replaced (to guarantee persistency in case ECLI's are renumbered).

See also
European Legislation Identifier (ELI)
Lex (URN)

References

External links
 ECLI website on the European e-Justice portal
ECLI search engine
Eur-Lex website

European Union law
Case law
Legal citation
Identifiers